Kornelija Šinković Pavićević (born June 24, 1964) is a retired Serbian sprinter who represented SFR Yugoslavia.

She started athletics as a 14-year-old girl in her hometown Subotica, as a member of Spartak athletics club. Later she moved to compete for AK Crvena Zvezda. She still holds national record in 100m with a time 11.34. Kornelija currently works as a coach in AK Mladenovac, where she lives.

See also
 Serbian records in athletics

External links
 IAAF Profile
 profile at AK Mladenovac and biography

1964 births
Living people
Yugoslav female sprinters
Serbian female sprinters
Sportspeople from Subotica
Mediterranean Games silver medalists for Yugoslavia
Athletes (track and field) at the 1987 Mediterranean Games
Mediterranean Games medalists in athletics